Vaudringhem is a commune in the Pas-de-Calais department in the Hauts-de-France region of France.

Geography
Vaudringhem is located 14 miles (23 km) southwest of Saint-Omer, on the D203 road.

Population

Places of interest
 The church of Saint Leger, dating from the eighteenth century.

See also
Communes of the Pas-de-Calais department

References

Communes of Pas-de-Calais